The 1999 WNBA season was the third for the Charlotte Sting.  The Sting won their first playoff series by defeating the Detroit Shock in the Eastern Conference Semifinals.  In the Eastern Conference Finals they would fall to the New York Liberty in three games.

Offseason

WNBA Draft

Regular season

Season standings

Season schedule

|- align="center" bgcolor="bbffbb"
| 1 || June 10 || @ Washington || 83-73 || Staley (23) || Reid (6) || Staley (7) || MCI Center  20,674 || 1-0
|- align="center" bgcolor="ffbbbb"
| 2 || June 12 || New York || 57-68 || Stinson (15) || Bullett (9) || Staley, Stinson (4) || Charlotte Coliseum  8,150 || 1-1
|- align="center" bgcolor="ffbbbb"
| 3 || June 19 || Los Angeles || 69-73 || McCarty (18) || Stinson (8) || Staley (7) || Charlotte Coliseum  6,116 || 1-2
|- align="center" bgcolor="ffbbbb"
| 4 || June 22 || @ Detroit || 69-75 || Bullett, Staley (13) || Mapp (10) || Staley (7) || Palace of Auburn Hills  7,212 || 1-3
|- align="center" bgcolor="bbffbb"
| 5 || June 24 || Phoenix || 88-72 || Stinson (23) || Bullett, Manning (7) || Staley (8) || Charlotte Coliseum  4,514 || 2-3
|- align="center" bgcolor="bbffbb"
| 6 || June 25 || @ Cleveland || 59-57 || Bullett (18) || Bullett (9) || Staley (5) || Gund Arena  7,255 || 3-3
|- align="center" bgcolor="ffbbbb"
| 7 || June 27 || @ New York || 58-72 || Stinson (15) || Manning (10) || McCarty, Stinson (3) || Madison Square Garden  13,337 || 3-4
|- align="center" bgcolor="ffbbbb"
| 8 || June 29 || Washington || 63-68 || Staley (22) || Bullett (9) || Staley (6) || Charlotte Coliseum  7,454 || 3-5
|-

|- align="center" bgcolor="bbffbb"
| 9 || July 3 || @ Orlando || 75-58 || Bullett (24) || Bullett, Smith (11) || Stinson (5) || TD Waterhouse Centre  10,005 || 4-5
|- align="center" bgcolor="bbffbb"
| 10 || July 7 || Cleveland || 75-62 || Staley (22) || Bullett (8) || Staley (5) || Charlotte Coliseum  4,760 || 5-5
|- align="center" bgcolor="ffbbbb"
| 11 || July 9 || Orlando || 61-66 || Smith (12) || Manning (7) || Staley (7) || Charlotte Coliseum  5,839 || 5-6
|- align="center" bgcolor="ffbbbb"
| 12 || July 10 || @ Cleveland || 56-82 || Stinson (17) || Bullett, Mapp (6) || Smith (4) || Gund Arena  9,089 || 5-7
|- align="center" bgcolor="ffbbbb"
| 13 || July 12 || @ Washington || 71-74 || Bullett, Stinson (19) || Mapp (8) || McCarty, Staley, Stinson (5) || MCI Center  12,124 || 5-8
|- align="center" bgcolor="bbffbb"
| 14 || July 16 || @ Orlando || 56-50 || Staley (23) || Stinson (8) || Stinson (5) || TD Waterhouse Centre  8,826 || 6-8
|- align="center" bgcolor="bbffbb"
| 15 || July 17 || Washington || 63-56 || Stinson (17) || Mapp (7) || Staley (5) || Charlotte Coliseum  7,819 || 7-8
|- align="center" bgcolor="bbffbb"
| 16 || July 19 || Utah || 73-66 || Stinson (16) || Manning (7) || Staley (9) || Charlotte Coliseum  4,190 || 8-8
|- align="center" bgcolor="ffbbbb"
| 17 || July 21 || Minnesota || 67-76 || Mapp (22) || Bullett (10) || Staley (5) || Charlotte Coliseum  4,665 || 8-9
|- align="center" bgcolor="ffbbbb"
| 18 || July 23 || Houston || 62-75 || Stinson (18) || Bullett (7) || Staley (7) || Charlotte Coliseum  8,829 || 8-10
|- align="center" bgcolor="bbffbb"
| 19 || July 25 || @ Detroit || 78-66 || Bullett (10) || Staley (9) || Staley (10) || Palace of Auburn Hills  7,215 || 9-10
|- align="center" bgcolor="bbffbb"
| 20 || July 26 || @ New York || 75-69 || Mapp (18) || Mapp (18) || Staley (8) || Madison Square Garden  14,778 || 10-10
|- align="center" bgcolor="bbffbb"
| 21 || July 28 || Detroit || 84-65 || Stinson (27) || 4 players (6) || Staley (7) || Charlotte Coliseum  6,588 || 11-10
|- align="center" bgcolor="bbffbb"
| 22 || July 30 || New York || 62-58 || Mapp (14) || Mapp (10) || Staley (7) || Charlotte Coliseum  6,537 || 12-10
|- align="center" bgcolor="bbffbb"
| 23 || July 31 || @ Minnesota || 56-52 || Stinson (7) || Bullett, Mapp (11) || Staley (5) || Target Center  12,690 || 13-10
|-

|- align="center" bgcolor="bbffbb"
| 24 || August 2 || Cleveland || 62-56 || Stinson (18) || Bullett, Manning, Mapp (7) || Staley (5) || Charlotte Coliseum  5,841 || 14-10
|- align="center" bgcolor="ffbbbb"
| 25 || August 4 || Sacramento || 62-68 ||  ||  ||  || Charlotte Coliseum   || 14-11
|- align="center" bgcolor="ffbbbb"
| 26 || August 6 || @ Houston || 51-81 ||  ||  ||  || Compaq Center   || 14-12
|- align="center" bgcolor="bbffbb"
| 27 || August 7 || Orlando || 64-60 ||  ||  ||  || Charlotte Coliseum   || 15-12
|- align="center" bgcolor="ffbbbb"
| 28 || August 9 || @ Utah || 65-67 ||  ||  ||  || Delta Center   || 15-13
|- align="center" bgcolor="ffbbbb"
| 29 || August 13 || @ Sacramento || 64-78 ||  ||  ||  || ARCO Arena   || 15-14
|- align="center" bgcolor="ffbbbb"
| 30 || August 15 || @ Phoenix || 54-65 ||  ||  ||  || America West Arena   || 15-15
|- align="center" bgcolor="ffbbbb"
| 31 || August 16 || @ Los Angeles || 65-76 ||  ||  ||  || Great Western Forum   || 15-16
|- align="center" bgcolor="ffbbbb"
| 32 || August 20 || Detroit || 57-58 ||  ||  ||  || Charlotte Coliseum   || 15-17
|-

Playoffs

References

External links
Rockers on Basketball Reference

Charlotte Sting seasons
Chicago
Charlotte Sting